The 30th Chess Olympiad, organized by FIDE and comprising an open and a women's tournament, as well as several other events designed to promote the game of chess, took place between June 7 and June 25, 1992, at the Philippine International Convention Center in Manila, Philippines.

Following the fall of the Iron Curtain, the field of competitors was quite different from previous Olympiads. Twelve of the 15 former Soviet republics now competed as independent nations, and they all finished in the top half. Meanwhile, an all-German team was present for the first time since World War II. Of the former Yugoslav republics, Croatia, Bosnia, and Slovenia appeared independently; Serbia-Montenegro and Macedonia did not. This Olympiad also marked the final appearance of Czechoslovakia and the re-appearance of South Africa.

With the Soviet team a thing of the past, all three medal ranks were now occupied by different ex-Soviet teams. Russia, captained by world champion Kasparov, took up the illustrious legacy of their predecessor and won by four points. Uzbekistan's silver was a small surprise; the Armenian bronze less so.

Open event

One-hundred-two teams from 100 different nations played a 14-round Swiss system tournament. One-hundred-four teams were signed up, but Yemen and Kenya never showed up, both forfeited their first two matches and were subsequently eliminated. Once again, the host nation had the right to field two additional teams.

In the event of a draw, the tie-break was decided by 1. The Buchholz system; 2. Match points; and 3. The Sonneborn-Berger system.

{| class="wikitable"
|+ Open event
! # !! Country !! Players !! Averagerating !! Points
|-
| style="background:gold;"|1 ||  || Kasparov, Khalifman, Dolmatov, Dreev, Kramnik, Vyzmanavin || 2648 || 39
|-
| style="background:silver;"|2 ||  || Loginov, Serper, Nenashev, Zagrebelny, Saltaev, Iuldachev || 2514 || 35
|-
| style="background:#cc9966;"|3 ||  || Vaganian, Akopian, Lputian, Minasian, Petrosian, Anastasian || 2575 || 34½
|}
{| class="wikitable collapsible collapsed"
! # !! Country !! Averagerating !! Points !! Buchholz !! MP
|-
| 4 ||  || 2611 || 34 ||  || 
|-
| 5 ||  || 2566 || 33½ || 450.0 || 
|-
| 6 ||  || 2544 || 33½ || 443.0 || 
|-
| 7 ||  || 2523 || 33½ || 440.0 || 
|-
| 8 ||  || 2560 || 33 || 450.0 || 
|-
| 9 ||  || 2629 || 33 || 449.5 || 
|-
| 10 ||  || 2638 || 33 || 444.5 || 
|-
| 11 ||  || 2544 || 32½ || 450.0 || 
|-
| 12 ||  || 2599 || 32½ || 443.5 || 
|-
| 13 ||  || 2580 || 32½ || 433.5 || 
|-
| 14 ||  || 2536 || 32½ || 432.0 || 
|-
| 15 ||  || 2488 || 32½ || 425.5 || 
|-
| 16 ||  || 2523 || 32½ || 408.5 || 
|-
| 17 ||  || 2588 || 32 || 447.0 || 
|-
| 18 ||  || 2551 || 32 || 440.0 || 
|-
| 19 ||  || 2541 || 32 || 430.5 || 
|-
| 20 ||  || 2448 || 32 || 420.5 || 
|-
| 21 ||  || 2439 || 32 || 409.5 || 
|-
| 22 ||  || 2531 || 31½ ||  || 
|-
| 23 ||  || 2584 || 31 || 457.5 || 
|-
| 24 ||  || 2530 || 31 || 439.0 || 
|-
| 25 ||  || 2525 || 31 || 426.5 || 
|-
| 26 ||  || 2584 || 31 || 422.5 || 
|-
| 27 ||  || 2521 || 31 || 419.0 || 
|-
| 28 ||  || 2476 || 31 || 414.0 || 
|-
| 29 ||  || 2430 || 30½ || 423.5 || 
|-
| 30 ||  || 2284 || 30½ || 405.5 || 
|-
| 31 ||  || 2478 || 30½ || 404.5 || 
|-
| 32 ||  || 2480 || 30 || 425.5 || 16
|-
| 33 ||  || 2429 || 30 || 425.5 || 14
|-
| 34 ||  || 2483 || 30 || 423.0 || 
|-
| 35 ||  || 2490 || 30 || 421.5 || 
|-
| 36 ||  || 2485 || 30 || 414.5 || 
|-
| 37 ||  || 2363 || 30 || 396.5 || 
|-
| 38 ||  || 2429 || 29½ || 428.0 || 
|-
| 39 ||  || 2490 || 29½ || 420.5 || 
|-
| 40 ||  || 2424 || 29½ || 414.5 || 
|-
| 41 ||  || 2483 || 29½ || 411.0 || 
|-
| 42 ||  "C" || 2355 || 29½ || 407.5 || 
|-
| 43 ||  || 2440 || 29½ || 404.5 || 
|-
| 44 ||  "B" || 2399 || 29½ || 401.0 || 
|-
| 45 ||  || 2376 || 29 || 416.5 || 
|-
| 46 ||  || 2473 || 29 || 416.0 || 
|-
| 47 ||  || 2355 || 29 || 407.0 || 
|-
| 48 ||  || 2436 || 28½ || 411.0 || 
|-
| 49 ||  || 2440 || 28½ || 410.5 || 
|-
| 50 ||  || 2454 || 28½ || 401.0 || 
|-
| 51 ||  || 2465 || 28½ || 395.5 || 
|-
| 52 ||  || 2391 || 28½ || 395.0 || 
|-
| 53 ||  || 2243 || 28½ || 390.5 || 
|-
| 54 ||  || 2435 || 28½ || 385.0 || 
|-
| 55 ||  || 2424 || 28 || 404.0 || 
|-
| 56 ||  || 2331 || 28 || 387.0 || 
|-
| 57 ||  || 2399 || 27½ || 402.5 || 
|-
| 58 ||  || 2316 || 27½ || 398.0 || 
|-
| 59 ||  || 2260 || 27½ || 363.0 || 
|-
| 60 ||  || 2183 || 27½ || 350.0 || 
|-
| 61 ||  || 2341 || 27 || 390.5 || 
|-
| 62 ||  || 2249 || 27 || 369.0 || 
|-
| 63 ||  || 2064 || 27 || 349.0 || 
|-
| 64 ||  || 2388 || 26½ || 397.5 || 
|-
| 65 ||  || 2266 || 26½ || 384.5 || 
|-
| 66 ||  || 2304 || 26½ || 374.0 || 
|-
| 67 ||  || 2060 || 26½ || 373.0 || 
|-
| 68 ||  || 2136 || 26½ || 359.0 || 
|-
| 69 ||  || 2111 || 26½ || 355.5 || 
|-
| 70 ||  || 2106 || 26 || 388.0 || 
|-
| 71 ||  || 2263 || 26 || 379.5 || 
|-
| 72 ||  || 2121 || 26 || 366.0 || 15
|-
| 73 ||  || 2136 || 26 || 366.0 || 12
|-
| 74 ||  || 2263 || 26 || 361.0 || 
|-
| 75 ||  || 2298 || 25½ || 384.5 || 
|-
| 76 ||  || 2051 || 25½ || 372.0 || 
|-
| 77 ||  || 2285 || 25½ || 366.5 || 13
|-
| 78 ||  || 2171 || 25½ || 366.5 || 11
|-
| 79 ||  || 2073 || 25½ || 358.0 || 
|-
| 80 ||  || 2065 || 25½ || 349.0 || 
|-
| 81 ||  || 2103 || 25½ || 334.5 || 
|-
| 82 ||  || 2311 || 25 || 381.5 || 
|-
| 83 ||  || 2280 || 25 || 346.0 || 
|-
| 84 ||  || 2051 || 25 || 318.5 || 
|-
| 85 ||  || 2274 || 24½ || 365.0 || 
|-
| 86 ||  || 2161 || 24½ || 349.5 || 
|-
| 87 ||  || 2000 || 24½ || 310.0 || 
|-
| 88 ||  || 2104 || 24 ||  || 
|-
| 89 ||  || 2051 || 23½ || 371.0 || 
|-
| 90 ||  || 2053 || 23½ || 311.5 || 
|-
| 91 ||  || 2103 || 23 || 335.0 || 
|-
| 92 ||  || 2000 || 23 || 327.0 || 
|-
| 93 ||  || 2110 || 22½ || 367.0 || 
|-
| 94 ||  and  || 2000 || 22½ || 317.5 || 
|-
| 95 ||  || 2051 || 22 || 317.0 || 
|-
| 96 ||  || 2000 || 22 || 306.5 || 
|-
| 97 ||  || 2054 || 21½ ||  || 
|-
| 98 ||  || 2000 || 21 ||  || 
|-
| 99 ||  || 2051 || 20½ ||  || 
|-
| 100 ||  || 2138 || 18 ||  || 
|-
| 101 ||  || 2123 || 16 ||  || 
|-
| 102 ||  || 2000 || 14 ||  || 
|}

Individual medals

 Performance rating:  Vladimir Kramnik 2958
 Board 1:  Garry Kasparov 8½ / 10 = 85.0%
 Board 2:  Jaime Sunye Neto 8 / 10 = 80.0%
 Board 3:  Alexander Nenashev 9½ / 12 = 79.2%
 Board 4:  Gustavo Zelaya 9 / 10 = 90.0%
 1st reserve:  Vladimir Kramnik 8½ / 9 = 94.4%
 2nd reserve:  Ognjen Cvitan 8 / 10 = 80.0%

Best game

The Brilliancy prize (along with around $4,000) went to Garry Kasparov (Russia) - Predrag Nikolić (Bosnia and Herzegovina) from round 12.

Women's event

Sixty-two teams from 61 different nations (including Philippines "B") played a 14-round Swiss system tournament. Morocco and Zimbabwe were signed up, but didn't show up for their first round matches and were disqualified. Their first three matches were listed as forfeit, after which they were officially withdrawn.

In the event of a draw, the tie-break was decided by 1. The Buchholz system; 2. Match points; and 3. The Sonneborn-Berger system.

Like the open event, the first women's tournament after the dissolution of the Soviet Union was dominated by the former Soviet republics. The Georgian team with two former world champions, Chiburdanidze and Gaprindashvili, took the gold, ahead of Ukraine and China, the latter led by reigning world champion Xie Jun. Defending champions Hungary, once again without any of the famous Polgar sisters, had to settle for fourth place.

{| class="wikitable"
! # !! Country !! Players !! Averagerating !! Points
|-
| style="background:gold;"|1 ||  || Chiburdanidze, Gaprindashvili, Ioseliani, Gurieli || 2460 || 30½
|-
| style="background:silver;"|2 ||  || Galliamova-Ivanchuk, Litinskaya, Chelushkina, Semenova || 2373 || 29
|-
| style="background:#cc9966;"|3 ||  || Xie Jun, Peng Zhaoqin, Wang Pin, Qin Kanying || 2398 || 28½
|}
{| class="wikitable collapsible collapsed"
! # !! Country !! Averagerating !! Points !! Buchholz
|-
| 4 ||  || 2343 || 26½ || 
|-
| 5 ||  || 2347 || 26 || 
|-
| 6 ||  || 2317 || 25 || 350.0
|-
| 7 ||  || 2293 || 25 || 342.0
|-
| 8 ||  || 2277 || 24½ || 347.0
|-
| 9 ||  || 2353 || 24½ || 346.5
|-
| 10 ||  || 2247 || 24 || 338.0
|-
| 11 ||  || 2232 || 24 || 324.5
|-
| 12 ||  || 2220 || 24 || 304.0
|-
| 13 ||  || 2308 || 23½ || 322.5
|-
| 14 ||  || 2280 || 23½ || 313.5
|-
| 15 ||  || 2215 || 23 || 328.5
|-
| 16 ||  || 2187 || 23 || 312.0
|-
| 17 ||  || 2158 || 23 || 310.5
|-
| 18 ||  || 2047 || 22½ || 310.0
|-
| 19 ||  || 2245 || 22½ || 309.0
|-
| 20 ||  || 2285 || 22½ || 303.5
|-
| 21 ||  || 2000 || 22½ || 295.5
|-
| 22 ||  || 2263 || 22 || 312.5
|-
| 23 ||  || 2078 || 22 || 305.5
|-
| 24 ||  || 2148 || 22 || 302.5
|-
| 25 ||  || 2175 || 22 || 302.0
|-
| 26 ||  || 2065 || 22 || 299.5
|-
| 27 ||  || 2002 || 22 || 264.0
|-
| 28 ||  || 2208 || 21½ || 320.0
|-
| 29 ||  || 2240 || 21½ || 306.0
|-
| 30 ||  || 2223 || 21½ || 301.0
|-
| 31 ||  || 2135 || 21½ || 294.5
|-
| 32 ||  || 2102 || 21½ || 292.5
|-
| 33 ||  || 2175 || 21½ || 292.0
|-
| 34 ||  || 2082 || 21½ || 288.5
|-
| 35 ||  || 2088 || 21½ || 277.0
|-
| 36 ||  || 2252 || 21 || 326.5
|-
| 37 ||  || 2083 || 21 || 298.0
|-
| 38 ||  || 2050 || 21 || 289.5
|-
| 39 ||  || 2012 || 21 || 262.5
|-
| 40 ||  || 2062 || 20 || 302.5
|-
| 41 ||  || 2225 || 20 || 294.5
|-
| 42 ||  || 2013 || 20 || 289.0
|-
| 43 ||  || 2018 || 20 || 274.0
|-
| 44 ||  || 2095 || 19½ || 302.0
|-
| 45 ||  || 2072 || 19½ || 286.0
|-
| 46 ||  || 2112 || 19½ || 284.5
|-
| 47 ||  || 2008 || 19½ || 279.0
|-
| 48 ||  || 2048 || 19½ || 267.5
|-
| 49 ||  || 2012 || 19½ || 250.0
|-
| 50 ||  || 2000 || 19½ || 241.0
|-
| 51 ||  "B" || 2000 || 19½ || 238.5
|-
| 52 ||  || 2033 || 19 || 275.0
|-
| 53 ||  || 2060 || 19 || 246.5
|-
| 54 ||  || 2002 || 18½ || 250.5
|-
| 55 ||  || 2000 || 18½ || 237.5
|-
| 56 ||  || 2000 || 17½ || 249.0
|-
| 57 ||  || 2033 || 17½ || 233.5
|-
| 58 ||  || 2000 || 14½ || 
|-
| 59 ||  || 2002 || 11½ || 237.0
|-
| 60 ||  || 2000 || 11½ || 235.5
|-
| 61 ||  || 2012 || 11 || 
|-
| 62 ||  || 2000 || 5 || 
|}

Individual medals

 Performance rating:  Maia Chiburdanidze 2692
 Board 1:  Maia Chiburdanidze 11½ / 13 = 88.5%
 Board 2:  Svetlana Prudnikova 8½ / 11 = 77.3%
 Board 3:  Nana Ioseliani 10 / 12 = 83.3%
 Reserve:  Suneetha Wijesuriya 6½ / 8 = 81.3%

References

External links

30th Chess Olympiad: Manila 1992 OlimpBase

30
Women's Chess Olympiads
Olympiad 30
Chess Olympiad 30
Olympiad 30
Chess Olympiad 30
20th century in Manila